The women's 400 metre individual medley event for the 1976 Summer Olympics was held in Montreal on 24 July. All swimmers in the final would have won the 1972 final in this event. Ulrike Tauber won in a new world-record time.

Results

Heats
Heat 1

Heat 2

Heat 3

Heat 4

Final

References

External links
Official Olympic Report

Swimming at the 1976 Summer Olympics
1976 in women's swimming
Women's events at the 1976 Summer Olympics